Čardak is a village in the municipality of Modriča, Republika Srpska, Bosnia and Herzegovina.

References

Populated places in Modriča